Acropora tenuis is a species of acroporid coral found in the Red Sea, the Gulf of Aden, the southwest, northwest and northern Indian Ocean, the Persian Gulf, the central Indo-Pacific, Australia, Southeast Asia, Japan, the East China Sea and the oceanic west and central Pacific Ocean.

Description
It occurs in corymbose colonies containing orderly-spaced branchlets. It has tube-shaped axial corallites and radial corallites have flaring lips. It is blue, cream, yellow or green in colour, and is similar to Acropora vermiculata.

Distribution
It is classed as a near threatened species on the IUCN Red List and it is believed that its population is decreasing; the species is listed under Appendix II of CITES. Figures of its population are unknown, but is likely to be threatened by the global reduction of coral reefs, the increase of temperature causing coral bleaching, climate change, human activity, the crown-of-thorns starfish (Acanthaster planci) and disease. It occurs in the Red Sea, the Gulf of Aden, the southwest, northwest and northern Indian Ocean, the Persian Gulf, the central Indo-Pacific, Australia, Southeast Asia, Japan, the East China Sea, and the oceanic western and central Pacific Ocean.

Biology
Acropora tenuis is a simultaneous hermaphrodite. Spawning takes place once a year and is synchronised among the colonies in any one locality. Packets of eggs and sperm are released into the water column and, being buoyant, rise to the surface. Here the packets break up and cross-fertilisation takes place with gametes from different colonies intermixing.

References

Acropora
Corals described in 1846
Near threatened animals